Inspector Gadget is a Canadian CGI animated television series produced by DHX Media that serves as a sequel to the original series of the same name, which aired from 1983 to 1986. The show was announced on June 11, 2013, with 26 episodes. The show debuted on January 3, 2015, on Boomerang in France and officially premiered on Teletoon in Canada on September 7, 2015. In the United States, it premiered as a streaming television series on Netflix on March 27, 2015.

On WildBrain's YouTube channel, the show is sometimes referred to as Inspector Gadget 2.0. The show served as the first time DHX Media (now WildBrain) produced a reboot of a television series produced by DIC Entertainment after acquiring Cookie Jar Group, which also included the DiC library.

Premise
When Dr. Claw is thawed out of his iceberg prison and reactivates M.A.D., Inspector Gadget is brought out of retirement and is back on the beat to stop Dr. Claw once again. This time, Penny and Brain officially work by Gadget's side. The series also introduces a new character in Dr. Claw's nephew, Talon. The series' tone is more comical than the original, with Dr. Claw being portrayed as much less sinister.

Production
The first public mention of a new Inspector Gadget series was on January 26, 2012, when Ray Sharma, the CEO of game developer XMG Studio said that the success of Inspector Gadget: M.A.D. Dash had "reinvigorated the TV brand with a new TV series in production".

The series was announced by Cookie Jar on October 2 that year with Teletoon as its Canadian broadcast partner. Michael Hirsh, the CEO of Cookie Jar said in the press release that they were looking to distribute the series worldwide (unlike the previous TV series, Gadget & the Gadgetinis, which never aired in America).

On June 9, 2013, Teletoon officially announced the series and revealed the first images of the title character's new design. On July 1, Jean Chalopin talked about how the reboot came to be, and how the television landscape had changed since the 1980s.

The show first aired on Boomerang Asia.

On October 8, 2015, Gadget's voice actor Ivan Sherry confirmed that they had started recording voices for a second season.

Episodes

Characters

HQ
 Inspector Gadget/Augustin Tamare (voiced by Ivan Sherry impersonating Don Adams) - Inspector Gadget is still the same powerful but unintelligent, gullible, and incompetent cyborg he was in the 1983 series and the Gadgetinis series, but now he's accompanied by Penny on his missions. As always, he's the bumbling "hero", only inadvertently saving the day and typically leaving a path of destruction in doing so. While he loves his niece, he still generally doesn't listen to Penny, even though she's his new assistant. Gadget is noticeably more egotistical than he was in the original series. He also has a new Gadget Mobile (since the old one turned to scrap after he repeatedly jinxed its condition), which is snug and more efficient than the previous one.
 Penny (voiced by Tara Strong) - Penny is Inspector Gadget's niece, an agent in training. She is brave, clever and willing to fight villains. She has a crush on Talon, Dr. Claw's nephew. Despite her crush, she never lets him get away with his and his uncle's evil plans. Unlike other Inspector Gadget productions, she now joins Gadget in his assignments and despite the show's title, she is effectively the protagonist. Also unlike the 80's series, she is a relatively adept fighter, only seldom getting caught by M.A.D. agents. Penny is still typically the one who really saves the day but never gets any recognition for it, generally happy to let her uncle take all the credit for completing the mission. Penny acts like a normal teenage girl when she's not on duty. Her computer book and watch have been replaced with a holographic tablet called the codex. Her middle name is Ruth. In International versions, she is called Sophie. This was not the first time that Strong had voiced a character in the Inspector Gadget franchise. She had previously voiced the character of Heather in the 1995 series Gadget Boy and Heather.
 Brain (vocal effects provided by Scott McCord) - Brain is Penny's dog, best friend and her sidekick and he always accompanies her to every mission. As always, he is a master of disguise and usually Gadget mistakes him for a M.A.D.-Agent and tries to apprehend him (even when Brain is attempting to save him or when Penny tries to tell him it's really Brain). In International versions, he is called Finot.
 Chief Quimby (voiced by Derek McGrath) - The leader of the HQ and always gets Gadget and Penny their missions. To manage this, he always appears at the strangest places. This time, instead of paper, his self-destructing messages are now holographic. Chief Quimby now wears glasses and a coat and his hair is blonde instead of brown. He is a lot more patient than he was in previous iterations of the show. In the International versions, he is named Chief Gontier.
 Professor Von Slickstein (voiced by Scott McCord) - An HQ scientist is portrayed as a young man, rather than a man in his late 60's in the original series. In the German version, he is named Professor Rotoskop.
 Kayla (voiced by Katie Griffin) - Penny's best friend, another new character and a fellow agent in training. Her cheerful and positive personality is only matched by her gift for being a blabbermouth, her motor mouth is strong enough to cripple even the toughest M.A.D.-goon. In the German version, she's called Karla.

M.A.D.
 Dr. Claw (voiced by Martin Roach) - As always, he wants to take over the world and destroy Gadget. This time, he has help from his nephew Talon who rescued him from his iceberg prison in the first episode. As always, his face is never shown (but his torso does appear now and then). His full name is revealed to be "Irving Thelonious Claw, Jr." In the German version, he is called Dr. (Boris) Kralle; in the French version, he is called Dr. Gang.
 MAD Cat - Unlike Dr. Claw's previous MAD Cats, this one is female. She is spoiled by Dr. Claw and shares a feud with Talon. MAD Cat would often do plans of her own with little success.
 Talon (voiced by Lyon Smith) - Introduced in this series, Talon is Dr. Claw's evil nephew who rescued him in the first episode. He is clever, handsome and manipulative. Talon is aware of his handsomeness and knows how to apply it. He secretly has a crush on Penny, but they cannot be together because they are enemies. In each possible situation that Talon wants to impress Penny, she mostly ignores him. Talon is one of a very small handful of M.A.D. agents who is aware that it is generally Penny, not Gadget, who foils M.A.D.'s plots. Even his uncle is oblivious to this fact. Talon is always arguing with his uncle because he considers his uncle's plans to be rather old-fashioned (although there is really nothing wrong with that) or just ridiculous, which is true. His uncle always blames him when his plans fail, even when it is not Talon's fault. There are even situations when Dr. Claw blames Talon for something his nephew has warned him of. Although he does everything to impress his uncle, Talon isn't treated very well by him. In the German version, he is named Titus. In the French version, he is called Tristan. In the Spanish version, he is called Garra. In the Russian version, he is called Claw in some series
 Mama Claw (voiced by Martin Roach) - Maryland Claw is Dr. Claw's mother and Talon's grandmother. From her constant nagging, she often embarrasses her son because Dr. Claw is taking orders from someone who is not him and often tries to get Dr. Claw and Talon to improve themselves. Mama Claw appeared in a few episodes. Like Dr. Claw, her face is never seen, but the back of her head hair and ears do appear now and then.
 M.A.D. Henchmen (Various Voices) - The generic henchmen of M.A.D.

M.A.D. Agents
 MADthew Strong (voiced by Cory Doran) - A construction worker.
 Commander MADhail (voiced by Cory Doran) - A Russian astronaut.
 Corsetta Camisole (voiced by Alyson Court) - She is a mistress of disguise who dresses fashionably.
 Detective Data (voiced by Alyson Court) - A former HQ operative. The reason why she started working for M.A.D. is because Gadget took credit for all her hard work which Chief praises him for despite Data's claims that she did the work.
 Malicious (voiced by Alyson Court) - Penny's secret friend who attends "Evil University." She enjoys medieval torture and weapons due to that they have the word "Evil." Also, Malicious has a huge crush on Talon.
 MAD Weed Wacko (voiced by Robert Tinkler) - He really hates plants so much more worst and even poison ivy.
 Cheekster (voiced by Robert Tinkler) - The mad wrestler.
 Little Old Lady - She first appeared in "Gadget Management" as part of a simulation where she said "M.A.D. Forever" using her cane to shoot.
 Mac Macintosh (voiced by Scott McCord) - An evil farmer in an apple costume.
 Mayor (voiced by Cory Doran) - An unnamed evil mayor.
 MADalena (voiced by Stacey DePass) - A M.A.D. Agent that looks like Penny. She once opened a resort near the Slopsquatch habitat.
 Cuckoo Clockmaker (voiced by Ron Pardo) - A man who's obsessively tinkering with clocks and doing the job "on Time." He also hates to work with Talon.
 Jacques Crankcase (voiced by Cory Doran) - A no-good cheating racer who will stop at nothing to win.
 MADtana Dan (voiced by Scott McCord) - An impetuous explorer and treasure hunter who steals priceless treasures for M.A.D.'s plots. Unlike the other M.A.D. Agents, MADtana Dan is never comfortable working with Talon.
 MADgician (voiced by Ron Pardo) - A magician who was once Gadget's assistant for birthday parties. But from all the humiliation Gadget gave him, he wants him to "disappear."
 MADison Von Trapp (voiced by Julie Lemieux) - Dr. Claw's best huntress with a metallic eagle. She is equipped with an invention called "The Cross-Boa" which is a crossbow with a robot snake.
 Sue Donym (voiced by Denise Oliver) - M.A.D.'s top spy who uses an attaching truth spray.
 Brawn - Sue Donym's shifty dog.

Other characters
 Baron von Steeltoe (voiced by Cory Doran) - A Scottish villain in metal boots who is Dr. Claw's rival.
 Dr. Ithica Marvins (voiced by Julie Lemieux) - HQ's greatest female archaeologist. Though every time she discovered something remarkable, she instantly gets captured or trapped.
 Nigel Saint De' Le-peppertone IV Esquire III (voiced by Robert Tinkler) - International pop star whistler. He first appeared in "Rock Out" then made cameos in some episodes.
 Sir Owen Barnstormer (voiced by Adrian Truss) - A billionaire who creates inventions like an animal nursery blimp and a train without the aid of tracks.

Release
On December 4, 2014, it was announced that the Inspector Gadget would air on Boomerang's international channels in 2015. The series premiered on Boomerang in Australia on January 5, 2015. The show premiered on January 14 in the Middle East and Africa on the DStv network. The series premiered on Cartoon Network Arabic in the Middle East on March 6. The series premiered on Boomerang in the United Kingdom and Ireland on February 16.

In the United States, the show was originally intended to air on Cartoon Network. However, on February 26, 2015, it was announced that it would instead be released exclusively through Netflix on March 27, 2015, As of November 20, 2017, the show is airing in the US on Universal Kids.

Beginning with the third season on January 8, 2018, the show would move to the DHX-owned Family Channel in Canada.

India's Pogo began airing the show on November 4, 2017.

Games
Teletoon also produced five web games on its website:
 Descent into MADNess
 Go Go Gadget Jetpack
 Talons Take Over
 Go Go Gadget Mobile
 Super Spy Gauntlet

References

External links
 
 

2015 Canadian television series debuts
2018 Canadian television series endings
2010s Canadian animated television series
2010s Canadian comic science fiction television series
Animated television series reboots
Canadian children's animated action television series
Canadian children's animated adventure television series
Canadian children's animated comic science fiction television series
Canadian children's animated science fantasy television series
Canadian computer-animated television series
Cyborgs in television
Animated television series about robots
Animated detective television series
Inspector Gadget
Netflix children's programming
Teletoon original programming
Family Channel (Canadian TV network) original programming
Television series by Corus Entertainment
Television series by DHX Media
English-language Netflix original programming